Cairn Ridge is a rock ridge adjoining the north side of Dufek Massif,  northeast of Hannah Peak, in the Pensacola Mountains. It was mapped by the United States Geological Survey from surveys and from U.S. Navy air photos, 1956–66. A cairn was erected on this ridge during a visit in December 1957 by the US-IGY traverse party from Ellsworth Station.

References 

Ridges of Queen Elizabeth Land